The Chickahominy Shipyard Archeological Site is a historic archaeological site located near Toano, Virginia. The shipyard was established in 1776 on the Chickahominy River by the Virginia Committee on Safety for the construction of a small navy to protect the Virginia colony during the American Revolution.  It remained in production until 1781, when the British seized and burned the shipyard.  The site consists of both submerged and dryland components.

It was listed on the National Register of Historic Places in 1979.

References

Archaeological sites on the National Register of Historic Places in Virginia
National Register of Historic Places in James City County, Virginia
American Revolution on the National Register of Historic Places